= 2021 Northampton County Executive election =

- November 2, 2021

Nominee	Lamont McClure	Steve Lynch
Party	Democratic	Republican
Popular vote	38,477	29,984
Percentage	56.14%	43.75%
- Precinct results McClure: 50–60% 60–70% 70–80% 80–90% Lynch: 50–60% 60–70% 70–80% Tie: 40–50%
County Executive before election
Lamont McClure
Democratic
Elected County Executive
Lamont McClure
Democratic

The 2021 Northampton County Executive election was held on November 2, 2021. Incumbent Democratic County Executive Lamont McClure ran for re-election to a second term. He won the Democratic primary unopposed and faced Republican activist Steve Lynch in the general election.

During the campaign, Lynch spread conspiracy theories about the results of the 2020 presidential election and suggested that he would not accept the results of the County Executive election. At a rally in Harrisburg on August 29, 2021, Lynch suggested that he would repeal school district mask mandates by force, saying, "I'm going in with 20 strong men. I'm going to speak in front of the school board and I'm going to give them an option: They can leave or they can be removed." McClure condemned Lynch's remarks, and requested that law enforcement investigate them, calling Lynch "a domestic terrorist" for attending Donald Trump's January 6 rally

McClure ultimately defeated Lynch by a wide margin, winning 56 percent of the vote to Lynch's 44 percent. However, Lynch refused to concede, instead alleging unspecified irregularities in the vote count, and closely monitored the post-election canvassing.

== Democratic primary ==
=== Candidates ===
- Lamont McClure, incumbent County Executive

=== Results ===
Democratic primary results
Party	Candidate	Votes	%
Democratic	Lamont McClure (incumbent)	18,480	99.59%
Democratic	Write-ins	76	0.41%
Total votes		18,556	100.00%

== Republican primary ==
=== Candidates ===
- Steve Lynch, Republican activist

=== Results ===
Republican primary results
Party	Candidate	Votes	%
Republican	Steve Lynch	14,722	99.51%
Republican	Write-ins	73	0.49%
Total votes		14,795	100.00%

== General election ==
=== Results ===
2021 Northampton County Executive election
Party	Candidate	Votes	%
Democratic	Lamont McClure (incumbent)	38,477	56.14%
Republican	Steve Lynch	29,984	43.75%
Write-in		71	0.10%
Total votes		68,532	100.00%
Democratic hold			
